Dennis Hayes is an American bass guitarist, currently playing for Beyond Fear.

Hayes began his career with the heavy metal band Wretch.  Later he was a founding member of the Progressive Heavy Metal band Castle Black with other former members of Wretch, Nick Giannakos (Lead Guitar) and Drummer, Jeff Currenton.  It was during this time where he began a long association with Tim "Ripper" Owens, as Castle Black and Winter's Bane often played the same venues around Northeastern Ohio.  Hayes eventually was offered, and accepted, membership in Winter's Bane. Both Hayes and Owens performed on Winter's Bane's 1993 debut album Heart of a Killer.  Dennis also played in the Heavy metal band Seven Witches from 2004 to 2005, but left to form Beyond Fear together with Owens, a side project to the singer's role in Iced Earth.

After James "Bo" Wallace left Iced Earth in March 2007, Hayes was called in to replace him on the band's upcoming tour. Following Owens' departure from Iced Earth later that year, Hayes also left the band.

Discography

With Iced Earth 
 2007 - Framing Armageddon (Something Wicked Part 1) (played on 2 songs)
 2008 - The Crucible of Man: Something Wicked Part 2 (played on 5 songs)

With Beyond Fear 
 2006 - Beyond Fear

With Seven Witches 
 2004 - Year of the Witch
 2005 - Amped (played on "Sunnydale High")
 2006 - Years of the Witch [DVD]

With Winters Bane 
 1993 - Heart of a Killer
 1997 - Girth

With Wretch 
 Reborn

With Tim "Ripper" Owens
 Play My Game (2009)

References 

American bass guitarists
Iced Earth members
Year of birth missing (living people)
Living people
Place of birth missing (living people)
Seven Witches members